Tatyshlinsky District (Täteşle rayonı) is an administrative and municipal district (raion), one of the fifty-four in the Republic of Bashkortostan, Russia. It is located in the north of the republic and borders with Perm Krai in the north, Askinsky District in the east, Baltachevsky District in the southeast and south, Burayevsky District in the south, and with Yanaulsky District in the southwest and west. Its administrative center is the rural locality (a selo) of Verkhniye Tatyshly. As of the 2010 Census, the total population of the district was 25,159, with the population of Verkhniye Tatyshly accounting for 26.4% of that number.

History
The district was established in 1935.

Administrative and municipal status
Within the framework of administrative divisions, Tatyshlinsky District is one of the fifty-four in the Republic of Bashkortostan. The district is divided into thirteen selsoviets, comprising seventy-five rural localities. As a municipal division, the district is incorporated as Tatyshlinsky Municipal District. Its thirteen selsoviets are incorporated as thirteen rural settlements within the municipal district. The selo of Verkhniye Tatyshly serves as the administrative center of both the administrative and municipal district.

References

Notes

Sources

Districts of Bashkortostan
States and territories established in 1935